RéCréation is a 1999 double album recorded by French singer Florent Pagny. It was his fifth studio album and his seventh album overall. It was on October 26, 1999, and achieved success in France and Belgium (Wallonia), where it remained charted respectively for 21 and 24 weeks, including a peak at #1 and at #4. This album contains cover versions of various successful songs originally recorded by other artists. There were two singles from this album : "Jolie môme" (#13 in France, #11 in Belgium) and "Les Parfums de sa vie (Je l'ai tant aimée)" (#38 in France, #30 in Belgium).

Track listing

CD 1
 "Les Parfums de sa vie (Je l'ai tant aimée)" (Guirao, Art Mengo) — 4:47
 "Pars" (Jacques Higelin) — 4:24
 "SOS amor" (Alain Bashung, Golemanas) — 4:54
 "Requiem pour un con" (Colombier, Serge Gainsbourg) — 4:00
 "Il voyage en solitaire" (Gérard Manset) — 3:44
 "J'oublierai ton nom" (Jean-Jacques Goldman, Michael Jones) (duet with Ginie Line) — 4:20
 "Jolie môme" (Léo Ferré) — 4:06
 "Vendeurs de larmes" (Daniel Balavoine) — 4:38
 "Hygiaphone" (Jean-Louis Aubert) — 3:05

CD 2
 "Quand j'étais chanteur" (Michel Delpech, Rivat, Vincent) — 4:29
 "Une seule journée passée sans elle" (Michel Jonasz) — 4:23
 "Heures hindoues" (Étienne Daho, Munday) — 3:58
 "Chère amie (toutes mes excuses)" (Aboulker, Marc Lavoine) — 4:09
 "Voilà c'est fini" (Guirao, Mengo) — 4:14
 "Tu manques" (Goldman) — 7:10
 "Partir" (Julien Clerc, Dabadie) — 4:14
 "Antisocial" (Bernie Bonvoisin, Krieff) — 4:42

Source : Allmusic.

Charts

Certifications and sales

Releases

References

1999 albums
Covers albums
Florent Pagny albums